The 2021 Koser Jewelers Tennis Challenge was a professional women's tennis tournament played on outdoor hard courts. It was the fourteenth edition of the tournament which was part of the 2021 ITF Women's World Tennis Tour. It took place in Landisville, Pennsylvania, United States between 9 and 15 August 2021.

Points and prize money

Point distribution

Prize money

Singles main-draw entrants

Seeds

 1 Rankings are as of 2 August 2021.

Other entrants
The following players received wildcards into the singles main draw:
  Alexa Glatch
  Danielle Lao
  Jamie Loeb
  Grace Min

The following player received entry using a protected ranking:
  Vitalia Diatchenko

The following players received entry from the qualifying draw:
  Ekaterine Gorgodze
  Beatriz Haddad Maia
  Mayo Hibi
  Mai Hontama
  Emma Raducanu
  Ankita Raina
  Daria Snigur
  Aldila Sutjiadi

The following player received entry as a Lucky loser:
  Sophie Chang

Champions

Singles

 Nuria Párrizas Díaz def.  Greet Minnen, 7–6(8–6), 4–6, 7–6(9–7)

Doubles

  Hanna Chang /  Alexa Glatch def.  Samantha Murray Sharan /  Valeria Savinykh, 7–6(7–3), 3–6, [11–9]

References

External links
 2021 Koser Jewelers Tennis Challenge at ITFtennis.com
 Official website

2021 ITF Women's World Tennis Tour
2021 in American tennis
August 2021 sports events in the United States
2021 in sports in Pennsylvania